A Web directory is a listing of Websites organized in a hierarchy or interconnected list of categories.

The following is a list of notable Web directory services.

General 
 DOAJ.org – Directory of Open Access Journals
 DMOZ (also known as Open Directory Project) – was at one point the largest directory of the Web. Its open content was mirrored at many sites. Offline since March 2017. Continued since August 2018 as Curlie.org.
 Jasmine Directory - Lists websites by topic and by region, specializing in business websites.
 Sources – general subject web portal for journalists, freelance writers, editors, authors and researchers; in addition to a search engine it includes a subject-based directory.
 Starting Point Directory – Founded in 1995, relaunched in 2006, charges a fee.
 World Wide Web Virtual Library (VLIB) – oldest directory of the Web.

Business directories 
 Business.com – Integrated directory of knowledge resources and companies, that charges a fee for listing review and operates as a pay per click search engine.
 Yell –  is a digital marketing and online directory business in the United Kingdom

Niche 

 Business.com – Integrated directory of knowledge resources and companies, that charges a fee for listing review and operates as a pay per click search engine.
 Library and Archival Exhibitions on the Web – international database of online exhibitions which is a service of the Smithsonian Institution Libraries.
 ProgrammableWeb – resource on APIs that provides a directory of APIs.
 Virtual Library museums pages – directory of museum websites around the world.

Regional 
 2345.com – Chinese web directory founded in 2005. The website is the second most used web directory in China.
 Alleba – Filipino search engine website, with directory.
 Dalilmasr – Egyptian online directory
 Timway – web portal and directory primarily serving Hong Kong.
 Bailaho – business directory serving Germany, Austria and Switzerland.

Defunct directories
 AboutUs.org – directory from 2005 to 2013.
 Anime Web Turnpike – was a web directory founded in August 1995 by Jay Fubler Harvey. It served as a large database of links to various anime and manga websites.
 Biographicon – directory of biographical entries.
 Google Directory – copy of DMOZ directory, with sites listed in PageRank order within each category. Closed in July 2011. 
 Internet Public Library – librarian-edited directory, product of a merger with the Librarians' Internet Index (LII) in 2010. Closed in June 2015.
 Intute – directory of websites for study and research. Maintenance stopped in July 2011, archives remain available.
 LookSmart – operated several vertical directories from 1995 to 2006.
 Lycos' TOP 5% – from 1995 until 2000 it aimed to list the Web's top 5% of Websites.
 Yahoo! Directory– first service that Yahoo! offered. Closed in December 2014.
 Yahoo! Kids – oldest online search directory for children, until its discontinuation as of April 30, 2013.
 Zeal – volunteer-built Web directory; it was introduced in 1999, acquired by LookSmart in 2000, and shut down in 2006.

See also

 List of search engines
 1337x – directory of torrent files and magnet links used for peer-to-peer file sharing through the BitTorrent protocol.
 Shopping directory

External links
 

 
Web Directories
web
Web directories